Rostrum (from Latin , meaning beak) is a term used in anatomy for a number of phylogenetically unrelated structures in different groups of animals.

Invertebrates
 In crustaceans, the rostrum is the forward extension of the carapace in front of the eyes. It is generally a rigid structure, but can be connected by a hinged joint, as seen in Leptostraca.
 Among insects, the rostrum is the name for the piercing mouthparts of the order Hemiptera as well as those of the snow scorpionflies, among many others. The long snout of weevils is also called a rostrum.
 Gastropod molluscs have a rostrum or proboscis.
 Cephalopod molluscs have hard beak-like mouthparts referred to as the rostrum.

Vertebrates

In mammals, the rostrum is that part of the cranium located in front of the zygomatic arches, where it holds the teeth, palate, and nasal cavity. Additionally, the corpus callosum of the human brain has a nerve tract known as the rostrum.

The beak or snout of a vertebrate may also be referred to as the rostrum.

 Some cetaceans, including toothed whales such as dolphins and beaked whales, have rostrums (beaks) which evolved from their jawbones. The narwhal possesses a large rostrum (tusk) which evolved from a protruding canine tooth.
 Some fish have permanently protruding rostrums which evolved from their upper jawbones. Billfish (marlin, swordfish and sailfish) use rostrums (bills) to slash and stun prey. Paddlefish, goblin sharks and hammerhead sharks have rostrums packed with electroreceptors which signal the presence of prey by detecting weak electrical fields. Sawsharks and the critically endangered sawfish have rostrums (saws) which are both electro-sensitive and used for slashing. The rostrums extend ventrally in front of the fish. In the case of hammerheads the rostrum (hammer) extends both ventrally and laterally (sideways).

See also

References

Animal anatomy